Ann Villella is an American voice actress, best known for portraying Condoleezza Rice on the first season of the television show Lil' Bush. Villella has also done commercial voice overs.

References

American voice actresses
Living people
Place of birth missing (living people)
Year of birth missing (living people)
21st-century American women